The 2023 Malaysia Super League is the 20th season of the Malaysia Super League, the top-tier professional football league in Malaysia for association football clubs since its establishment in 2004, and the 42nd season of top-flight Malaysia football overall.  It is the first season after restructuring, with 18 teams (instead of 12). However, MFL announced there will be only 16 teams as they rejected both Sarawak United and Melaka United due to failed licensing appeal. The league shrunk to 15 teams after Petaling Jaya City officially withdrawn due to the expansion and increased foreign player quota, which are diverted from the club's main vision. On 5 January 2023, UiTM officially withdrawn due to the financial problems. The new season therefore has 14 teams, kicking-off on 24th February.

The defending champion from the 2022 Malaysia Super League season is Johor Darul Ta'zim.

Teams

Changes from last season

Team changes
Promoted from the 2022 Malaysia Premier League
 Kelantan
 Kuching City
 Kelantan United
 PDRM
 Perak

Expelled or Withdrawn from the 2023 Malaysia Super League

Clubs locations

Personnel, kit and sponsoring

Coaching changes
Note: Flags indicate national team as has been defined under FIFA eligibility rules. Players may hold more than one non-FIFA nationality.

Foreign players

Southeast Asia (SEA) players are required to have acquired at least 3 international caps for their senior national team with no period restriction on when they are earned while those who has less than 3 international caps will be subjected to MFL approval.

All team in the Super League can register nine foreign players, but allowed only five import players to be fielded, which is three plus one Asian player and one ASEAN player.  In addition, at any one time while only one import player can be on the bench.

Note: Flags indicate national team as defined under FIFA eligibility rules. Players may hold more than one FIFA and non-FIFA nationality.

 Players name in bold indicates the player is registered during the mid-season transfer window.
  Foreign players who left their clubs or were de-registered from playing squad due to medical issues or other matters.

Naturalisation/Heritage players

Notes:
  Carrying Malaysian heritage.
  Capped for Malaysia national team.

League table

Position by round

Result table

Season statistic
 First goal of the season: 4 minutes 36 seconds
  Juan Muniz for Johor Darul Ta’zim (H) against Terengganu  (24 February 2023)
 Fastest goal in a match: 2 minutes 9 seconds
  Park Tae-Soo for Sabah (H) against Penang (17 March 2023
 Latest goal in a match: 90 + 11 minutes 51 seconds
  Rizal Ghazali for Sabah (H) against Penang (17 March 2023)
 Oldest goalscorer in a match: 41 years 5 months 28 days
  Indra Putra Mahayuddin for Kelantan United (A) against Sabah (1 March 2023)

Top goalscorers

Own goals

Top Assists

Hat-trick
 

Notes
(H) – Home team
(A) – Away team

Clean Sheets

 

Notes:
  Did not played full time.

Discipline

Players
 Most yellow cards:3
  Latiff Suhaimi (Kelantan United)
  Kenny Pallraj (Kuala Lumpur City)
  Sebastian Avanzini (Kuala Lumpur City)
  Adam Shreen (Kuching City)
  Amir Saiful (PDRM)
 Most red cards:1
  Manuel Ott (Kedah Darul Aman)
  Wan Amirul Afiq (Kedah Darul Aman)
  Christian Rontini (Kelantan)
  Ramadhan Hamid (PDRM)
  Namathevan Arunasalam (Penang)
  Soony Saad (Penang)
  Haziq Puad (Perak)
  Nasrol Amri (Perak)
  Sunday Afolabi (Perak)

Club
 Most red cards:3
 Perak

 Most yellow cards:16
 PDRM

 Fewest yellow cards:6
 Negeri Sembilan
 Perak

 Fewest red cards:0
 Johor Darul Ta'zim
 Kelantan United
 Kuala Lumpur City
 Kuching City
 Negeri Sembilan
 Sabah
 Selangor
 Sri Pahang
 Terengganu

Attendance to Stadium

Overall Attendance 

Last Updated : 18 March 2023 

Source : FAM CMS

References

See also
 2023 Piala Sumbangsih
 2023 Malaysia M3 League
 2023 Malaysia M4 League
 2023 Malaysia M5 League
 2023 Malaysia FA Cup
 2023 Malaysia Cup
 2023 MFL Challenge Cup
 2023 MFL Cup
 2023 Piala Presiden
 2023 Piala Belia

Malaysia Super League
Malaysia Super League seasons
1